The Gregg Reference Manual: A Manual of Style, Grammar, Usage, and Formatting is a guide to English grammar and style, written by William A. Sabin and published by McGraw-Hill. The book is named after John Robert Gregg. The eleventh (“Tribute”) edition was published in 2010. The ninth Canadian edition, entitled simply The Gregg Reference Manual with no subtitle, was published on February 25, 2014.

The book was first published in 1951 as the Reference Manual for Stenographers and Typists by Ruth E. Gavin of the Gregg Publishing Company.

The book is widely used in business and professional circles. Neil Holdway, a news editor on the Chicago Daily Herald said the book "can answer the tough grammar questions, and it has provided me with authoritative yet readable explanations I can comfortably pass on to the newsroom when discussing our fair language."

Editions
These are the years of publication of all the editions of the Gregg Reference Manual in the United States:
1st: 1951
2nd: 1956
3rd: 1961
4th: 1970
5th: 1977
6th: 1985
7th: 1992
8th: 1996
9th: 2001
10th: 2005
11th: 2010

References

External links
 

Style guides for American English
1951 non-fiction books
McGraw-Hill books